Marcelino Palentini (September 17, 1943 – September 18, 2011) was the Roman Catholic bishop of the Roman Catholic Diocese of Jujuy, Argentina.

Born in Italy, Palentini was ordained to the priesthood in 1975. In 1995, he was named bishop served until his death on September 17, 2011.

Notes

21st-century Roman Catholic bishops in Argentina
Italian Roman Catholic bishops in South America
1943 births
2011 deaths
20th-century Roman Catholic bishops in Argentina
Roman Catholic bishops of Jujuy